The Winnett Block is a site on the National Register of Historic Places located in Winnett, Montana.  It was added to the Register on October 8, 2009. Built in 1918 from locally quarried sandstone, it was originally for commercial use.  It became the Petroleum County Courthouse in 1928.

References

Commercial buildings on the National Register of Historic Places in Montana
Courthouses on the National Register of Historic Places in Montana
National Register of Historic Places in Petroleum County, Montana
Commercial buildings completed in 1919
1917 establishments in Montana
County courthouses in Montana